Ahmed Belkorchi (born 1952) is a Moroccan footballer. He competed in the men's tournament at the 1972 Summer Olympics.

References

External links
 

1952 births
Living people
Moroccan footballers
Morocco international footballers
Olympic footballers of Morocco
Footballers at the 1972 Summer Olympics
Kawkab Marrakech players
Botola players
Place of birth missing (living people)
Association football goalkeepers